The Merchant of Venice is a 1961 Australian television adaptation of the play by William Shakespeare.

Cast
Owen Weingott as Shylock
Tanya Halesworth as Portia
Ron Graham as Bassanio
John Unicomb as Antonio
Annette Andre as Jessica
Barry Creyton as Lorenzo
John Faasen as Gratiano
Carolyn Keely as Nerissa
Alistair Roberts as Lancelot Gobbo
Leonard Teale as the Prince of Morocco

Production
The Sydney Morning Herald called it "the most important television play of the year. and among Sydney's actresses the role of Portia was the most sought after."

It went to the relatively inexperienced Tanya Halesworth who was a presenter at the ABC (she had only acted once on stage in The Women). She won the role over two other candidates. Director Alan Burke said "I am not unduly worried that Tanya hasn't done Shakespeare before because I haven't produced a Shakespeare play before."

Burke saw Portia "as a beautiful debutante, the darling of the deb set of her day. I wanted a beautiful girl for the role, one with wit, astuteness, vivacity; but one with a little bit of edge to her tongue. Tanya has all these."

All members of the cast except Halesworth and Andre had experience doing Shakespeare. Weingott, Graham, Roberts and Vernon had all performed their roles in previous productions of Merchant on stage.

Annette Andre later recalled "here I was, a nice Catholic girl – God! I’m a long way from that now – playing Jessica, daughter of Shylock. I would’ve loved to play Portia, but Tanya gave a wonderful performance."

Barry Creyton later recalled, "I remember during my vital speech to Jessica, “how sweet the moonlight sleeps upon this bank”, a makeup girl dropped a jar nearby. That was very disconcerting, but being live, we just continued as if a makeup jar dropping onto concrete was a common sound in old Venice." He also remembered that when the programme was recorded that "lost half an hour of sound", so he and Annette Andre "had to go back to the studio to loop one of our scenes."

Creyton said the cast "wanted to make the Shakespeare accessible to even a non-Shakespearean ear. We tried to make it sound like actual conversational English and were criticised by old Shakespearean actors for doing so."
 
Leonard Teale had appeared in a production of the play at the Independent.

In September 1961 the ABC presented a radio adaptation of the play done in Melbourne, with a cast including Patricia Kennedy and James Bailey.

Reception
The Sydney Morning Herald called it "a masterful piece of work in which a predominant young cast gave the play flesh-and-blood virility".

The Australian Woman's Weekly said the play was "an eye-opener to me. THE eye-opening came from the depth of Tanya Halesworth's portrayal of Portia, the strength of Owen Weingott's Shylock, and producer Alan Burke's fresh interpretation and splendid production. I expected it to be good, but not as good as it was."

Filmink thought "Alan Burke shows skill with blocking actors and moving the camera, though is reticent to use close ups apart from when characters are performing soliloquies. "

The play was screened in Melbourne along with two other Shakespeare plays on the school syllabus, A Midsummer Night's Dream and the Royston Morley production of Hamlet.

References

External links
The Merchant of Venice at IMDb

Australian television plays
1961 television plays
Films directed by Alan Burke (director)